Pine Manor College (PMC) was a private college in Chestnut Hill, Massachusetts. It was founded in 1911 and was historically a women's college until 2014. It currently serves fewer than 400 students, many of whom live on the 40-acre campus. Originally the college was a post-graduate program of Dana Hall School, an all girl's preparatory high school, although later on it was an independent college serving primarily students of color.

In May 2020, with the institution's longterm financial instability exacerbated by the COVID-19 pandemic, Boston College announced that it would take over the college, in a graduated scheme that allowed outgoing Pine Manor students to study on their campus through the 2022 school year.

History

Finishing school 
The college was founded in 1911 as Pine Manor Junior College (PMJC) by Helen Temple Cooke, as part of the Dana Hall School in Wellesley, Massachusetts. It was a women-only institution at a time when women were generally denied access to higher education. Mary Almy was the architect.

Author and educator Ella Lyman Cabot taught at PMJC in its early days. Pioneering female architect Eleanor Manning O'Connor taught at PMJC in the 1930s; educator Mary Nourse taught history there in 1933–1934. Mary Virginia Harris, a veteran of World War II who served in the Women Accepted for Volunteer Emergency Service (WAVES) program and who wrote its manual, was a dean there.

In 1965 the school moved to a  estate in the Chestnut Hill neighborhood of Brookline. The estate, then known as Roughwood, was the residence of Ernest B. Dane, at that time president of the Brookline Savings and Trust. Many of the school's buildings are original to the estate and have been renovated to accommodate the college.

Transition to a four-year college 
In 1977, under the leadership of President Rosemary Ashby, the school expanded its mission to offer four-year bachelor's degrees, and became Pine Manor College. However, by the end of President Ashby's tenure in the mid-nineties, enrollment had declined by 50 percent to less than 300 full-time students, threatening the survival of the college.

New mission 
In 1996, under new president Gloria Nemerowicz, the school changed its mission from educating women in the social elite to educating women of color from under-served communities. This was made possible, in large part, due to the generosity of wealthy older alumnae; in 1998, Pine Manor College cut its tuition by 34 percent after receiving a bequest of $4 million from Frances Crandall Dyke '25. Although this shift increased enrollment and brought the school praise and admiration, the school's financial endowment declined.

In 2011, the college failed to meet the financial benchmarks required by its accreditation agency. Fiscal year 2012 ended with a $1.7 million deficit. In May 2013, the college sold 5.2 acres to New England Patriots quarterback Tom Brady for $4.5 million to build his family home. The school had earlier sold off another acre for a home site.

In September 2014, the college welcomed its first co-ed class, admitting men for the first time in its 103-year history. The following year, President E. Joseph Lee stepped down amidst reports of the school's financial difficulties and declining enrollment.

In April 2016, the New England Association of Schools and Colleges placed Pine Manor on probation, risking the loss of its accreditation. President Tom O'Reilly took the helm in May 2016. One year later, the town of Brookline informed the college that they would be seeking to seize seven acres of the school's 52 acres under eminent domain for the building of an elementary school.

In 2018, the New England Association of Schools and Colleges removed Pine Manor from probation, ensuring the college's continuous accreditation since it began offering degrees. In May 2019, Pine Manor College was recognized by NASPA and the Center for First-Generation Student Success for its commitment to serving first-generation college students.

Takeover by Boston College 
The COVID-19 pandemic cut off most of Pine Manor College's revenue, and in May 2020, Boston College announced it would merge Pine Manor College into Boston College, retaining the campus for some of its existing programs, including Learning to Learn, Options Through Education, and the Thea Bowman AHANA and Intercultural Center. The Pine Manor College campus became the Pine Manor Institute for Student Success with a $50 million endowment from Boston College. Outgoing Pine Manor College students had the option to stay for two years and then transfer to Boston College's Woods College for Advancing Studies, while some Pine Manor College faculty and staff joined Boston College with the rest receiving severance and outplacement assistance.

Academics

Pine Manor College offered nine undergraduate majors. Upon graduation, students received the Bachelor of Arts, Bachelor of Science, Associate of Arts, or the Associate of Science.

From 2006 to 2021, PMC offered a four-semester Master of Fine Arts in creative writing known as the Solstice Low-Residency MFA Program. The Solstice program moved to nearby Lasell University in 2022.

The college hosted two English as a second or foreign language programs, which also served as university pathways programs.

Athletics
Pine Manor athletic teams were the Gators. The college was a member of the Division III level of the National Collegiate Athletic Association (NCAA), primarily competing in the Coast to Coast Athletic Conference (C2C), to only spend its only season during the 2020–21 school year, which was their final season of the college's athletic program.

The college's athletic teams had previously competed as NCAA Independents and as members of the now-defunct American Collegiate Athletic Association from 2017–18 to 2019–20. Its women's teams competed as members of the Great South Athletic Conference (GSAC) from 2012–13 to 2015–16 (the final season of the conference before disbanding). Pine Manor also competed as a member of the Great Northeast Athletic Conference (GNAC) from 1995–96 to 2011–12.

PMC offered women's athletics in the sports of basketball, cross country, softball, soccer, and volleyball. The college also previously fielded teams in women's tennis and lacrosse. The school started offering men's athletics in 2014 with the addition of men's basketball and soccer teams. In 2015, the school added men's cross country. The men's volleyball team started varsity competition in 2017. Pine Manor added its fifth men's sport, and tenth sport overall, in 2017–18 with the addition of baseball. In 2018, after receiving conference titles in both men's soccer and basketball, the American Collegiate Athletic Association awarded Pine Manor College the inaugural ACAA Men's President's Cup.

The school sports mascot was the Gator.

Pine Manor College Child Study Center 
The Pine Manor College Child Study Center was founded in 1974. Owned by Pine Manor College, this private, non-profit preschool center was licensed by the Massachusetts Department of Early Education and Care (EEC) and served 40 children per day between the ages of 2 years 9 months through age 6. The school was initially founded to broaden the learning experiences of the Pine Manor College students who were studying Early Childhood Education and Child Development, and to provide a quality preschool for families in the community. The Child Study Center continued to serve as a laboratory school for college students providing students experiential learning and training, while offering part- and full-day quality preschool experience to young children year-round.

Notable people

Notable alumnae 
 Wallis Annenberg, heiress
 Josephine Abercrombie, businesswoman
 Doran Clark, actress
 Wendy Diamond, founder of Animal Fair magazine
 Meg Gallagher, actress
 Busty Heart, entertainer
 Leslie Hindman, auctioneer
 Karyn Kupcinet, actress
 Lori Lieberman, singer-songwriter ("Killing Me Softly with His Song")
 Dorothy McGuire, Academy Award-nominated actress
 Heather Nauert, journalist and former public official
 Mary Curtiss Ratcliff, visual artist
 Hillary B. Smith, Daytime Emmy-winning actress
 Pauline Tompkins, president of Cedar Crest College
 Constance H. Williams, politician
 Lydia Woodward, television writer and co-producer of ER

Pine Manor College presidents 
 1911–1916: Helen Temple Cooke
1916–1928: Adele Lathrop
1928–1929: Constance Warren
1929-1930: Helen Temple Cooke (interim)
1930–1952: Marie Warren Potter
 1952–1956: Alfred Tuxbury Hill
 1956–1974: Frederick Carlos Ferry Jr.
 1974–1996: Rosemary Ashby
 1996–2011: Gloria Nemerowicz
 2011–2012: Alane K. Shanks
 2012–2013: Ellen Hurwitz (interim)
 2013–2015: E. Joseph Lee
 2015–2016: Rosemary Ashby (interim)
 2016–2020: Thomas M. O'Reilly

References

 
Former women's universities and colleges in the United States
Educational institutions established in 1911
Educational institutions disestablished in 2020
1911 establishments in Massachusetts
2020 disestablishments in Massachusetts
Defunct private universities and colleges in Massachusetts